Takarlikovo (Täkärlek) is a rural locality (a selo) in Takarlikovsky Selsoviet, Dyurtyulinsky District, Bashkortostan, Russia. The population was 255 as of 2010. There are 6 streets.

Geography 
Takarlikovo is located 8 km southwest of Dyurtyuli (the district's administrative centre) by road. Gublyukuchukovo is the nearest rural locality.

References 

Rural localities in Dyurtyulinsky District